Shanghai High School International Division (SHSID; Chinese: 上海中学国际部) is an international school in Shanghai, China, that was founded in 1993 as the international division of Shanghai High School. SHSID offers grades 1 through 12. Its sole language of instruction is English, though all students are required to take Chinese classes.

History
In 1865, Qing dynasty official Ding Richang established the Longmen Academy. The school changed names and moved campus several times, but its current site was converted by the Empire of Japan during the Second World War into the Lunghua Civilian Assembly Center, an internment camp for American and European citizens. James Graham Ballard was interned in the camp as an adolescent. His experiences there inspired the book (and subsequent film) Empire of the Sun. The school was restored after the war, and it was renamed to Shanghai High School in 1950.

On June 1, 1993, Shanghai High School approved the establishment of an International Division. On its Puxi and Pudong campuses, SHSID has had more than 2,900 students from over 65 different nations and regions. Academic courses are taught in English. The high school curriculum is based on education in the United States, the IB Diploma Programme, and the Advanced Placement Program. A-Level courses were added in 2017. As a division of one of the oldest high schools in Shanghai and all of China, SHSID is also known as one of the first international schools established in the People's Republic of China and is a UNESCO school. In 2018, SHSID was accredited by AdvancED as an international school.

Curricula

American-based curriculum
Approximately 800 compulsory and optional courses are offered for students in Grades 1 through 12.  Different levels (including Standard, Standard Plus, and Honors) are available in each subject to meet the varying academic requirements of individual students. AdvancED accredited SHSID in 2018. (COGNIATM).

A-LEVEL course, AP course and IB Diploma program
In addition to the American-based curriculum, SHSID offers challenging academic courses and programs in high school, such as AS&A-level courses, Advanced Placement courses (AP), and the IB Diploma Program (IBDP). Students select high school courses based on their interests and academic abilities. Languages, literature, social sciences, math, natural sciences, the arts, and other subjects are covered in the AS&A-LEVEL and IB DP and AP courses offered at SHSID. Every year, more than 90% of G11-12 students choose one of the three challenging courses and programs, while the remaining 10% choose school courses. SHSID students have excelled in IB/AP/A level exams over the last five years.

School exams and test center
SA school year at SHSID is divided into two semesters. In a semester, students take midterm and final exams, as well as two monthly assessments. Based on these exams, semester overall scores are calculated to reflect a student's overall academic performance in a semester. With the two semester overall scores, a year overall GPA is calculated. Students are ranked based on their overall GPA for the year.

SHISD is a test center of TOEFL, PSAT, SAT and ACT.

Campus
The Shanghai High School campus spans an area of 223,617 square meters. The school campus has numerous buildings, two lakes (Zhongxing and Nianci Lakes), several small meadows, several gymnasiums, and various sports facilities. The campus exists on what was once a Japanese Prison camp during WWII, Lunghua Civilian Assembly Center, years before the establishment of the International Division.

Zhongxing Building (中兴楼), located next to the Zhongxing Lake, had been the regular class building for SHSID's high school freshman and sophomores until June 2019. A new Zhentao Building (甄陶楼) was erected in 2019 as the main class building for students in grades 8-10, consisting of four floors and a basement.

Xianmian Building (先棉堂), located near the Laboratories and Shangzhong Road gate, is the building where high school juniors and seniors regularly have class.

The Yifu Building (逸夫楼) of the school sports four stories of laboratories and an astronomical observatory on its roof. These laboratories allow for experiments to be conducted for chemistry, physics, and biology, which are roughly allocated to the first, second, and third floors, respectively. A modern analytical chemistry section was also opened recently for conducting advanced experiments, including mass spectrometry, IR and UV spectroscopy, gas chromatography, and atomic absorption spectroscopy. There are also classrooms dedicated to robotics, electrical engineering, and simulated driving.

Athletic facilities
The school has a small number of facilities dedicated to physical education, including basketball courts, badminton courts, indoor and outdoor tennis courts, a gymnasium, volleyball courts, gymnastics/martial arts training rooms, Badminton/Ping Pong Building, a standard 400 meter track with a sandpit, soccer fields, and an Olympic-sized 50-meter swimming pool. The school also has a gym that students can use for activities such as basketball, volleyball, and badminton, and a darts room for the darts elective that the school offers. The basketball courts also provide a wide area of concrete in which various sports competitions such as tug-o-war and dodgeball are held. They are also known to host occasional mock military exercises.

Art and music centers
SHSID's Art Center is built with two-story-high ceilings made out of wood and windows placed high above. Inside the Art Center is the SHS History Exhibition. 

Its staff include watercolor artist Fu Gang (傅钢) and studio arts instructors for both the AP and IB Program's Studio/Visual Arts curricula.

Auditoriums

Auditoriums of varying size dot the campus, the majority of them located in school buildings and are "assigned" to sections. The largest auditorium, the Main Auditorium (大礼堂), is located right behind the local division building. This is where school-wide events such as the Art Festival, Talent Show, and the Opening Ceremony are held. The Big Auditorium has a media center on its second floor.

Extracurricular activities

Students can participate in extracurricular activities such as a film club, an art club, and a variety of sports such as badminton, American football, and football. There are also numerous opportunities for students to participate in academic extracurricular activities, such as the World Scholar's Cup.

Student government

SHSID has a student governing body known as the ASB, or Associated Student Body. Every year, members of the ASB are elected in each grade and classified according to their sections (primary, junior, senior, etc.). The ASB is in charge of organizing school activities such as inter-homeroom competitions, holiday parties and fairs, dances, academic competitions, and various services such as Blackout,Summer Bash, Christmas gram distribution, etc.

School events
Every year, the Art Festival and Talent Show are held (separately for each division primary, junior, or senior). Students can participate in a variety of performing arts, such as short plays and piano recitals, as well as rock bands and dance routines.

A sports day is also held annually and organized separately for each division (primary, junior, or senior). Competitions include track and field (100 m, 200 m, 400 m, and 800 m), Shot Put, Medicine Ball, High Jump, Long Jump, and 4 × 100 m relays.

The school hosts an annual charity fair where students set up stands and sell goods to raise funds for charity. This is frequently a culturally active event, with international students displaying their respective countries' unique foods, drinks, and trinkets. The charity fair, like many other school events, is grade or division specific.

The NEXUS
The Nexus is a student-run charity organization that was founded in 2008 at Shanghai High School International Division. The Nexus, a branch of The Library Project, raises funds and collects children's books to build libraries for elementary schools in rural China. To accomplish this, charity events and activities are held in SHSID or between international schools in Shanghai, such as basketball tournaments, fashion shows, dance competitions, book collections, and so on.

Every winter, The Nexus organizes high school students to travel to rural areas to assist elementary schools in building libraries and completing other tasks. Dragon TV (东方卫视) filmed an hour-long documentary about their charitable efforts in May 2012, which aired on June 21. The Nexus is celebrating its tenth anniversary; with over 700 members, it is the largest student organization at SHSID and among international schools in Shanghai.

Publications 
The SHSID|Times is a monthly student-run publication. Since its inception in 2014, the team has grown to nearly 100 students across the high school section by 2020.

Clubs
SHSID has numerous school clubs, including Live 2 Drama, Eco Cap, MUN, WSC, USAD, and Biology Workshop. These clubs have organized school activities such as poetry contests, sports contests, stargazing nights, math and science competitions, and so on. Almost every student participates in several school clubs to satisfy their individual interests and curiosities, and classrooms are frequently occupied with club meetings during the lunch break. The walls of the school building also demonstrate the large number of clubs, with wallpapers in a variety of colors advertising club events.

SHSID's high school debate teams have won back-to-back championships in the Hong Kong-Shanghai Inter-city Real Time Debate on Net English Sections (8th and 9th sessions). 
SHSID's History team was the consecutive champion in Asia in the International History Bee and Bowl

Sport teams
SHSID is home to a diverse group of athletic teams. Table tennis, track and field, volleyball, badminton, baseball, swimming, basketball, soccer, and tennis are among the sports represented.

Notable people
Writer Richard Gordon was a teacher at SHSID from fall 2005 until his death in February 2009.

Photo gallery

See also 

 List of international schools in Shanghai
 List of international schools

References

International schools in China
Schools in Shanghai
High schools in Shanghai